Ghosts is the debut studio album by American musician Ash Riser. It was self-released on July 7, 2017. The album was supported by two singles, "Lord Don't Fail Me Now" featuring Left Brain and "Moon Cry" featuring Papo and Mike G.

Track listing

 All tracks are written and produced by Ash Riser, except where noted.

References

2017 debut albums
Ash Riser albums
Albums produced by Left Brain
Albums produced by Tae Beast